Dhamangaon is a city and a municipal council in Amravati district in the state of Maharashtra, India. Dhamangaon is one of the three talukas (Other two are Chandur Railway and Nandgaon Khandeshwar) in Chandur (Railway) subdivision in Amravati district. The municipal council is named as Dattapur-Dhamangaon Municipal council.

Demographics
 India census, Dhamangaon had a population of 100,000. Males constitute 51% of the population and females 49%. Dhamangaon has an average literacy rate of 85%, higher than the national average of 59.5%: male literacy is 83% and, female literacy is 88%. In Dhamangaon, 12% of the population is under 6 years of age.

Climate
Dhamangaon has a tropical climate with hot, dry summers and mild to cool winters. Summer lasts from March to June, monsoon season from July to October and winter from November to March. The warmest month is May. About 979 mm of precipitation falls annually.

Governance
Dattapur-Dhamangaon is a Municipal Council is the local authority in the city. The Dattapur-Dhamangaon city is divided into 17 wards for which elections are held every 5 years.

Professions
Out of total population, 60,000 were engaged in work or business activity. Of this 50,000 were males while 10,000 were females. Of total 25000 working population, 89.27% were engaged in Main Work while 10.73% of total workers were engaged in Marginal Work. This region mostly depends on the cotton & agricultural business.

Transport
Dhamangaon is well connected by road and trains to other important cities. Dhamangaon railway station is a railway station serving Dhamangaon town, in Amravati district of Maharashtra State of India. It is under Nagpur railway division of Central Railway Zone of Indian Railways. It is located on Howrah–Nagpur–Mumbai line of the Indian Railways. As of 2016, electrified double Broad Gauge railway line exist and at this station, 40 trains stops. Dr. Babasaheb Ambedkar International Airport (Nagpur), is at distance of 105 kilometers.

References

Cities and towns in Amravati district
Talukas in Maharashtra